This article is a list of diseases of cultivated wild rice (Zizania palustris).

 
Fungal Brown Spot is the only significant commercial disease of cultivated wild rice. It is found mostly in the cultivated wild rice fields of Minnesota.

Bacterial  diseases

Fungal diseases

Viral diseases

References
Common Names of Diseases, The American Phytopathological Society

Wild rice
Wild rice